The Zydeco Spice is a team in the Women's Football Alliance. The team began play in the 2010 season as the Acadiana Zydeco and returned for the 2021 season under a new name.   Based in the Acadiana region (and more specifically the Lafayette metropolitan area) of Louisiana, the Zydeco plays its home games at Lafayette Christian Academy in Lafayette. They are named after the Zydeco, a local Creole dance in Acadiana.

Season-By-Season

|-
|2010 || 0 || 8 || 0 || 3rd American Southern || --
|-
|2011 || 1 || 7 || 0 || 3rd American Gulf || --
|-
|2012 || 4 || 4 || 0 || 2nd National Gulf Coast || --
|-
|2013 || 3 || 6 || 0 || 2nd American Gulf Coast || Lost American Conference Wild Card (St. Louis)
|-
|2014 || 3 || 5 || 0 || 2nd American Gulf Coast || --
|-
|2015 || 5 || 4 || 0 || 1st American Gulf Coast || Lost Midwest Regional Alliance Bowl (Houston)
|- 
|2016 || 6 || 2 || 0 || 1st WFA3 American Midwest || Won WFA3 League Championship (Richmond)
|- 
|2017 || 0 || 8 || 0 || 5th WFA3 American Midwest || --
|- 
|2018 || 0 || 8 || 0 || 5th WFA3 American Midwest || --
|- 
|2019 || 1 || 3 || 0 || 5th WFA3 American Midwest || --
|- 
|2020 || colspan=5 |''Season cancelled due to COVID-19 pandemic.
|- 
|2021 || 3 || 2 || 0 || 7th WFA3 American Midwest || --
|- 
!Totals || 26 || 57 || 0 ||  || 
|-
|colspan="2"|

References

External links 
Acadiana Zydeco website (under construction)
Women's Football Alliance website

Defunct American football teams in Louisiana
Sports teams in Lafayette, Louisiana
Women's Football Alliance teams
Acadiana
St. Landry Parish, Louisiana
American football teams established in 2010
2010 establishments in Louisiana
2019 disestablishments in Louisiana
Women's sports in Louisiana